This is a list of listed buildings in Dumfries and Galloway. The list is split out by parish.

 List of listed buildings in Annan, Dumfries and Galloway
 List of listed buildings in Anwoth, Dumfries and Galloway
 List of listed buildings in Applegarth, Dumfries and Galloway
 List of listed buildings in Balmaclellan, Dumfries and Galloway
 List of listed buildings in Balmaghie, Dumfries and Galloway
 List of listed buildings in Borgue, Dumfries and Galloway
 List of listed buildings in Buittle, Dumfries and Galloway
 List of listed buildings in Caerlaverock, Dumfries and Galloway
 List of listed buildings in Canonbie, Dumfries and Galloway
 List of listed buildings in Carsphairn, Dumfries and Galloway
 List of listed buildings in Castle Douglas, Dumfries and Galloway
 List of listed buildings in Closeburn, Dumfries and Galloway
 List of listed buildings in Colvend And Southwick, Dumfries and Galloway
 List of listed buildings in Crossmichael, Dumfries and Galloway
 List of listed buildings in Cummertrees, Dumfries and Galloway
 List of listed buildings in Dalbeattie, Dumfries and Galloway
 List of listed buildings in Dalry, Dumfries and Galloway
 List of listed buildings in Dalton, Dumfries and Galloway
 List of listed buildings in Dornock, Dumfries and Galloway
 List of listed buildings in Dryfesdale, Dumfries and Galloway
 List of listed buildings in Dumfries, Dumfries and Galloway
 List of listed buildings in Dunscore, Dumfries and Galloway
 List of listed buildings in Durisdeer, Dumfries and Galloway
 List of listed buildings in Eskdalemuir, Dumfries and Galloway
 List of listed buildings in Ewes, Dumfries and Galloway
 List of listed buildings in Gatehouse Of Fleet, Dumfries and Galloway
 List of listed buildings in Girthon, Dumfries and Galloway
 List of listed buildings in Glasserton, Dumfries and Galloway
 List of listed buildings in Glencairn, Dumfries and Galloway
 List of listed buildings in Gretna, Dumfries and Galloway
 List of listed buildings in Half Morton, Dumfries and Galloway
 List of listed buildings in Hoddom, Dumfries and Galloway
 List of listed buildings in Holywood, Dumfries and Galloway
 List of listed buildings in Hutton And Corrie, Dumfries and Galloway
 List of listed buildings in Inch, Dumfries and Galloway
 List of listed buildings in Johnstone, Dumfries and Galloway
 List of listed buildings in Keir, Dumfries and Galloway
 List of listed buildings in Kells, Dumfries and Galloway
 List of listed buildings in Kelton, Dumfries and Galloway
 List of listed buildings in Kirkbean, Dumfries and Galloway
 List of listed buildings in Kirkcolm, Dumfries and Galloway
 List of listed buildings in Kirkconnel, Dumfries and Galloway
 List of listed buildings in Kirkcowan, Dumfries and Galloway
 List of listed buildings in Kirkcudbright, Dumfries and Galloway
 List of listed buildings in Kirkgunzeon, Dumfries and Galloway
 List of listed buildings in Kirkinner, Dumfries and Galloway
 List of listed buildings in Kirkmabreck, Dumfries and Galloway
 List of listed buildings in Kirkmahoe, Dumfries and Galloway
 List of listed buildings in Kirkmaiden, Dumfries and Galloway
 List of listed buildings in Kirkmichael, Dumfries and Galloway
 List of listed buildings in Kirkpatrick Durham, Dumfries and Galloway
 List of listed buildings in Kirkpatrick Irongray, Dumfries and Galloway
 List of listed buildings in Kirkpatrick-Fleming, Dumfries and Galloway
 List of listed buildings in Kirkpatrick-Juxta, Dumfries and Galloway
 List of listed buildings in Langholm, Dumfries and Galloway
 List of listed buildings in Leswalt, Dumfries and Galloway
 List of listed buildings in Lochmaben, Dumfries and Galloway
 List of listed buildings in Lochrutton, Dumfries and Galloway
 List of listed buildings in Lockerbie, Dumfries and Galloway
 List of listed buildings in Middlebie, Dumfries and Galloway
 List of listed buildings in Minnigaff, Dumfries and Galloway
 List of listed buildings in Mochrum, Dumfries and Galloway
 List of listed buildings in Moffat, Dumfries and Galloway
 List of listed buildings in Morton, Dumfries and Galloway
 List of listed buildings in Mouswald, Dumfries and Galloway
 List of listed buildings in New Abbey, Dumfries and Galloway
 List of listed buildings in New Galloway, Dumfries and Galloway
 List of listed buildings in New Luce, Dumfries and Galloway
 List of listed buildings in Newton Stewart, Dumfries and Galloway
 List of listed buildings in Old Luce, Dumfries and Galloway
 List of listed buildings in Parton, Dumfries and Galloway
 List of listed buildings in Penninghame, Dumfries and Galloway
 List of listed buildings in Penpont, Dumfries and Galloway
 List of listed buildings in Portpatrick, Dumfries and Galloway
 List of listed buildings in Rerrick, Dumfries and Galloway
 List of listed buildings in Ruthwell, Dumfries and Galloway
 List of listed buildings in Sanquhar, Dumfries and Galloway
 List of listed buildings in Sorbie, Dumfries and Galloway
 List of listed buildings in St Mungo, Dumfries and Galloway
 List of listed buildings in Stoneykirk, Dumfries and Galloway
 List of listed buildings in Stranraer, Dumfries and Galloway
 List of listed buildings in Terregles, Dumfries and Galloway
 List of listed buildings in Tinwald, Dumfries and Galloway
 List of listed buildings in Tongland, Dumfries and Galloway
 List of listed buildings in Torthorwald, Dumfries and Galloway
 List of listed buildings in Troqueer, Dumfries and Galloway
 List of listed buildings in Tundergarth, Dumfries and Galloway
 List of listed buildings in Twynholm, Dumfries and Galloway
 List of listed buildings in Tynron, Dumfries and Galloway
 List of listed buildings in Urr, Dumfries and Galloway
 List of listed buildings in Wamphray, Dumfries and Galloway
 List of listed buildings in Westerkirk, Dumfries and Galloway
 List of listed buildings in Whithorn, Dumfries and Galloway
 List of listed buildings in Wigtown, Dumfries and Galloway

Dumfries and Galloway